The Xuefeng Mountains are a mountain range of China in western Hunan province.

The Xuefeng Mountains lie in the heart of Hunan. They are an extension of the highlands in the province's west, which run northeast to southwest and form the eastern edge of the Guizhou Plateau. The composition of the mountains is mainly slate, quartzite, and sandstone. The mountains have numerous deep gorges formed by the many rivers that flow through it.

References

Mountain ranges of Hunan